SS Ivernia was a British ocean liner owned by the Cunard Line, built by the company Swan Hunter & Wigham Richardson of Newcastle upon Tyne, England, and launched in 1899. The Ivernia was one of Cunard's intermediate ships, that catered to the vast immigrant trade. Together with her sister ship RMS Saxonia, the Ivernia worked on Cunard's service from Liverpool to Boston and then later on the immigrant run the Cunard Line had established from Fiume and Trieste to New York City.

Following the outbreak of World War I in August 1914 the Ivernia was hired by the British government as a troop transport.

On 1 January 1917, the Ivernia was carrying some 2,400 British troops from Marseille to Alexandria, when at 10:12am she was torpedoed by the German submarine UB-47 58 miles south-east of Cape Matapan in Greece, in the Kythira Strait. The ship went down fairly quickly with a loss of 36 crew members and 84 troops.  Captain Turner, who had been criticised for not going down with the Lusitania (even though he had believed he was the last person on board), remained on the bridge until all aboard had departed in lifeboats and rafts "before striking out to swim as the vessel went down under his feet."

 rescued a number of survivors and armed trawlers towed the bulk, who had taken to lifeboats, to Suda Bay in Crete.

Today Ivernia Road in Walton in Liverpool still bears the name of the doomed vessel.

References

External links
 Photograph of Ivernia
 Ivernia history 
 Wrecksite

Ocean liners
Maritime incidents in 1917
Ships sunk by German submarines in World War I
World War I shipwrecks in the Mediterranean Sea
Ships of the Cunard Line
1899 ships
Ships built by Swan Hunter
Ships built on the River Tyne